Casual vacancies in the Dewan Rakyat (House of Representatives) are filled through by-elections, which may occur when a member of the Dewan Rakyat dies, resigns or for some other reason. When a member of the Dewan Rakyat resigns, he or she would normally tender the resignation to the Speaker, who has a discretion as to whether and when to call a by-election. The Speaker may choose not to call one at all, if, for example, a general election is imminent.

Brackets around a date indicate that the candidate was unopposed when nominations closed.  These candidates were declared "elected unopposed" with effect from the date of the closing of nominations, and there was no need to hold a by-election.

15th Parliament (2022–present)

14th Parliament (2018–2022)

13th Parliament (2013–2018)

12th Parliament (2008–13)

11th Parliament (2004–08)

10th Parliament (1999–2004)

9th Parliament (1995–99)

8th Parliament (1990–95)

7th Parliament (1986–90)

6th Parliament (1982–86)

5th Parliament (1978–82)

4th Parliament (1974–78)

3rd Parliament (1971–74)

2nd Parliament (1964–69)

1st Parliament (1959–64)

Federal Legislative Council (1955–59)

 
Parliament of Malaysia